Anugerah (English: Blessing) is an Indonesian television soap opera with 473 episodes. It was produced by SinemArt and directed by Leo Sutanto.

Synopsis
The show tells the story of Nabila, a beautiful girl who is the best student at her university and faces a bright future. Her life suddenly changes when her father, Arif, whom she loves, is diagnosed with kidney failure and must undergo surgery. Nabila is running out of ways to help her father and she asks her stepmother, Lisa, for assistance. Nabila incidentally meets Endang, a wealthy woman, who understands her and is kind enough to help, because she went through the same thing with her son Rino.

Nabila also meets Fandy, the son of Sugih, a wealthy businessman who loves his three children very much. Sugih has asked Fandy to stop painting, to take a job at his company, and to get married, like his half-brother, Bima. Bima, who has been married for a long time to Wulan, really wants a child. Moreover, Hera, Bima's mother, knows that Fandy must soon get married, so she introduces Nabila to him. Hera is afraid that Fandy will be the first to have a child, however, as this will prevent her from inheriting Sugih's wealth. She pressures Wulan to undergo various treatments, but Wulan seems unable to bear children. Erlin, Wulan's mother, suggests that she seek the services of a surrogate mother, to which Wulan eventually agrees, though neither one tells Bima about their plan.

Erlin finds Mawar, who is willing to take on the role for a steep fee but in the end, Nabila becomes surrogate mother for Wulan. In order to fool Bima, Wulan pretends to be pregnant, but he eventually finds out and is disappointed.

Cast and characters

International broadcasts

External links
 Anugerah

Indonesian television series